Fredy Abel Maidana Pedrozo (born 1994) is Paraguayan sprinter and holds the List of Paraguayan records in athletics for 100m and 200m in Paraguay.

Career
During the second national athletics evaluative competition of 2015, Maidana ran the 100m in 10.76s.

References

External links
 

1994 births
Living people
Paraguayan male sprinters
Athletes (track and field) at the 2018 South American Games
Athletes (track and field) at the 2022 South American Games
21st-century Paraguayan people